Paul Sun-Hyung Lee (born August 16, 1972) is a Korean-Canadian actor and television host. He is best known for his roles as Randy Ko in the soap opera Train 48 (2003–2005) and as family patriarch Appa in the play Kim's Convenience (2011) and its television adaptation (2016–2021).

Lee has won the Canadian Screen Award for Best Actor in a Comedy Series four times for his role as Mr. Kim in Kim's Convenience, and has been nominated twice for the Dora Mavor Moore Award for Outstanding Performance by a Male in a Principal Role, Large Theatre, for The Monster Under the Bed in 2010 and the stage version of Kim's Convenience in 2012.

Early life
When Lee was three months old, his parents immigrated from Daejeon, South Korea to Canada, living in London, Toronto and Calgary. In 1990, he moved back to Toronto to attend the University of Toronto, where he attended the drama program at University College.

Career
He had a supporting role in the film Ice Princess (2005) playing Tiffany's father. Lee appeared in the horror film P2 and the thriller The Echo. In 2006, he took the role of Jung Park in the video game Rainbow Six: Vegas and its 2008 sequel Rainbow Six: Vegas 2.

Lee was part of the main cast of the Global nightly improvised soap opera Train 48 in the role of Randy Ko for the entire run of the series from 2003 to 2005.

In 2012, Lee won the Best Actor citation from the Toronto Theatre Critics' Awards for his portrayal of Kim Sang-il in Kim's Convenience. He played the role of Appa on stage in several Toronto productions of Kim's Convenience and on a national tour with the Soulpepper theatre company, as well as at an Off Broadway staging of the play. He brought the role of Appa to television in 2016 when the show was adapted as a television series. In 2016, Lee played Zhang Lin in the Royal Manitoba Theatre Centre/Canadian Stage production of Chimerica. On January 11, 2017, he guest starred on an episode of This Hour Has 22 Minutes.

Lee has been nominated twice for the Dora Mavor Moore Award for Outstanding Performance by a Male in a Principal Role, Large Theatre, for The Monster Under the Bed in 2010 and Kim's Convenience in 2012. In the 5th, 6th, and 9th Canadian Screen Awards, he won the Best Actor in a Comedy Series for his portrayal of Appa in the Kim's Convenience television series. Lee was selected to host the fourth season of the reality competition show Canada's Smartest Person, entitled Canada's Smartest Person Junior and featuring children as contestants.

Lee is also a playwright, with his own play Dangling premiering at Toronto's fu-GEN theatre festival in 2010.

In 2021 he appeared as a panelist on Canada Reads, championing Natalie Zina Walschots's novel Hench. In the same year, Lee's five seasons on Kim's Convenience came to an abrupt end when the two show runners left the project.

In 2022 he was announced as the host of Fandemonium, a factual series which will profile the internal cultures of various pop culture fandoms. He also appeared on the 2022 revival of The Kids in the Hall. He is set to play Uncle Iroh in the Netflix live action version of Avatar: The Last Airbender.

Filmography

Film

Television

Video games

References

External links

BitterAsianDude.com Personal website

1972 births
Living people
20th-century Canadian male actors
21st-century Canadian dramatists and playwrights
21st-century Canadian male actors
21st-century Canadian male writers
Best Actor in a Comedy Series Canadian Screen Award winners
Canadian male actors of Korean descent
Canadian male dramatists and playwrights
Canadian male film actors
Canadian male stage actors
Canadian male television actors
Canadian male video game actors
Canadian male voice actors
Canadian television hosts
Canadian writers of Asian descent
Male actors from Alberta
People from Daejeon
South Korean emigrants to Canada
University of Toronto alumni